The Bay Correctional Facility  is a private state prison for men located in Panama City, Bay County, Florida, which has been operated since February 2014 by the GEO Group under contract with the Florida Department of Corrections.  This facility was opened in 1995 and has a maximum capacity of 985 prisoners.  Corrections Corporation of America was the prior operator of the prison.

References

Prisons in Florida
Buildings and structures in Bay County, Florida
GEO Group
1995 establishments in Florida